

First-team squad
Squad at end of season

Left club during season

Competitions

Bundesliga

League table

Champions League

Second qualifying round

Third qualifying round

Group stage

Second group stage

References

SK Sturm Graz seasons
Sturm Graz